The Ministry of Environment of the Republic of Lithuania oversees the environment and natural resources in Lithuania. Its mission is:
To implement the principle of sustainable development;
To set preconditions for rational utilization, protection and restoration of natural resources; 
To ensure provision of information about the state of environment and its forecasts to the public;
To create conditions for the development of construction business and the provision of residents with housing;
To ensure a proper environmental quality, taking into account the norms and standards of the European Union.

The Environment Protection Department, accountable to the Supreme Council – Reconstituent Seimas, was established to oversee environment protection and exploitation of natural resources after Lithuania declared independence from the Soviet Union in 1990. In 1996, the Department was reorganized into Ministry of Environmental Protection. In 1998, after the merger with Ministry of Housing and Urban Development, it was renamed to Ministry of Environment. Thus it became responsible for construction, territorial planning, and housing. The Ministry has numerous divisions and subordinate institutions responsible for protected areas, environment protection, geological survey, forestry, metrology, meteorology services, and marine research. The Ministry also runs the Tadas Ivanauskas Zoological Museum.

Ministers

References

 
Lithuania
Environment
Housing in Lithuania